Kas laimės milijoną? (English translation: Who will win the million?) was a Lithuanian game show based on the original British format of Who Wants to Be a Millionaire?. The show was originally hosted by Henrikas Vaitiekūnas, later replaced by Vytautas Kernagis. The main goal of the game was to win 1 million litai by answering 15 multiple-choice questions correctly. There were three lifelines - 50:50 (vienas iš dviejų), Phone a Friend (skambutis draugui) and Ask the Audience (salės pagalba). Kas laimės milijoną? was broadcast from 16 May 2002 to 18 August 2005. It was shown on the Lithuanian TV station TV3 Lithuania. When a contestant got the fifth question correct, they left with at least 1,000 litai. When a contestant got the tenth question correct, they left with at least 32,000 litai. The biggest winner is Rita Nikolskienė, who won 64,000 litai on 9 May 2003.

Payout structure

References

Who Wants to Be a Millionaire?
2002 Lithuanian television series debuts
2005 Lithuanian television series endings
2000s Lithuanian television series
TV3 (Lithuania) original programming

lt:Kas laimės milijoną?